is a Japanese track and field athlete who specializes in middle and long-distance running. She is the current Japanese record holder in the women's 1500 metres and 3000 metres.

Tanaka represented Japan at the 2019 World Athletics Championships in the 5000 metres, and at the 2020 Tokyo Olympics, competing in the 1500m and 5000m.

Competition record

National titles
 Japan Championships in Athletics
 1500 metres: 2020, 2021
 5000 metres: 2020

References

External links
 
 

1999 births
Living people
Sportspeople from Hyōgo Prefecture
Japanese female middle-distance runners
Japanese female long-distance runners
Japanese female cross country runners
World Athletics Championships athletes for Japan
World Athletics U20 Championships winners
Japan Championships in Athletics winners
Athletes (track and field) at the 2020 Summer Olympics
Olympic athletes of Japan